This is a list of cities granted the title of National Garden City by Ministry of Housing and Urban-Rural Development of the People's Republic of China.

A
 Anning, Yunnan
 Anqing

B
 Baoji
 Baotou
 Beijing

C
 Changchun
 Changji
 Changshu
 Changzhi
 Changzhou
 Chaozhou
 Chengdu

D
 Dalian
 Dengfeng
 Diaobingshan
 Dongguan
 Dujiangyan City

F
 Foshan
 Fuyang
 Fuzhou

G
 Guang'an
 Guangzhou
 Guilin
 Guiyang

H
 Haikou
 Handan
 Hangzhou
 Hefei
 Huaibei
 Huainan
 Huangshan City
 Huangshi
 Huizhou
 Huzhou

J
 Jiangmen
 Jiangyin
 Jiaonan
 Jiaozuo
 Jiaxing
 Jilin City
 Jincheng
 Jingdezhen
 Jiyuan

K
 Kaiping
 Karamay
 Korla
 Kunshan
 Kuytun

L
 Laiwu
 Langfang
 Leshan
 Linhai

M
 Ma'anshan
 Maoming
 Mianyang
 Minhang District

N
 Nanchang
 Nanjing
 Nanning
 Nantong
 Nanyang, Henan
 Ningbo

P
 Pudong
 Puyang

Q
 Qian'an, Hebei
 Qingzhou
 Qinhuangdao
 Quanzhou
 Quzhou

R
 Rizhao
 Rongcheng, Shandong
 Rushan, Shandong

S
 Sanming
 Sanya
 Shanghai
 Shaoxing
 Shenyang
 Shenzhen
 Shihezi
 Shijiazhuang
 Shiyan
 Shouguang
 Siping, Jilin
 Songyuan
 Suzhou

T
 Taicang
 Tangshan
 Tongling
 Tongxiang

W
 Weihai
 Wendeng District
 Wugang, Henan
 Wuhan
 Wujiang District, Suzhou
 Wuxi

X
 Xiamen
 Xiangyang
 Xintai
 Xinxiang
 Xinyu
 Xuchang
 Xuzhou

Y
 Yangzhou
 Yanshi
 Yantai
 Yichang
 Yichun, Heilongjiang
 Yichun, Jiangxi
 Yinchuan
 Yiwu
 Yixing
 Yong'an
 Yueyang

Z
 Zhangjiagang
 Zhangzhou
 Zhanjiang
 Zhaoqing
 Zhengzhou
 Zhenjiang
 Zhongshan
 Zhuhai
 Zhuji
 Zhuzhou
 Zibo
 Zunyi

References

Garden
China, Garden
Lists of populated places in China